Rubio is a town in the Venezuelan Andean state of Táchira.  Founded in 1794 by Gervasio Rubio, this town is the shire town of the Junín Municipality and, according to the 2001 Venezuelan census, the municipality has a population of 68,869.

Rubio is one of the largest towns in the state of Táchira. Its importance derives from its coffee production and the nearby commerce that exists with Colombia. Venezuela's former president, Carlos Andrés Pérez,  was also born in Rubio.

Rubio has beautiful natural tunnels called La Cueva de los Miagros. There are some rivers and waterfalls on the outskirts of town. The town has many bridges especially in Old Rubio.  For this reason it is called "Ciudad Pontalida" or "City of Bridges." Rubio is located in the west  of Estado Táchira and is a 40-minute drive from San Cristóbal, the capital of Táchira.

History
Rubio was founded by Gervasio Rubio in 1794.  It was then the capital of the Táchira State, before the capital was moved to San Cristóbal.  Rubio is sometimes called "La Ciudad Pontalida" ("The City of Bridges") and housed Christiansen Academy, an international school.

Demographics
The Junín Municipality, according to the 2001 Venezuelan census, has a population of 68,869 (up from 53,981 in 1990).  This amounts to 6.9% of Táchira's population.  The municipality's population density is 566.2 people per square mile (218.63/km²).

Government
Rubio is the shire town of the Junín Municipality in Táchira.  The mayor of the Junín Municipality is Angel Marquez Elected in 2017 after winning the elections against Jobel Sandoval at the end of 2017

The economy of the city is based on coffee production.  The first exploitation of oil in Venezuela (1883) was in La Petrolia by the company "Compañia Nacional Minera Petrolía del Táchira" and the first well was called "Salvador" ("Savior").

Sites of interest

Religious buildings
Catedral de Santa Bárbara de Rubio

Squares and parks
Plaza Simón Bolívar
Parque la Petrolia
Plaza Urdaneta
Plaza Gervasio Rubio

Notable people
Carlos Andrés Pérez, President of Venezuela (1974-1979) and (1989-1993).
Carlos Zapata, Architect.
Konrad Bernheimer, Art Dealer and Collector
Roberto Giusti, Journalist and Author

References

External links

junin-tachira.gob.ve 
Information on the Junín Municipality 
More information on the Junín Municipality 
desderubio.com 

Cities in Táchira
Populated places established in 1794
1794 establishments in the Spanish Empire